Jakup Ferri (c.1832 – 4 December 1879) was a notable Albanian fighter from Plav-Gusinje who served as a local leader in the League of Prizren's resistance during the Principality of Montenegro's attempt to subjugate his homeland in 1879. He was distinguished in the Battle of Novšiće, where he died.

Family 
He was born in 1832 to an ethnic Albanian family in Plav. His father Ferr Duri descended from the Kuči tribe. His great-great-grandfather Gjergj Prentashi with his brother had left Kuči for Podgorica and then settled in Plav, where they converted to Islam. His great-grandfather Shaban had two sons Halil and Dur. In turn, Dur had two sons Hajro and Ferr, the father of Jakup Ferri. He had three brothers Zeqo, Shaqir and Beqir, who died in the battle of Novsice. His mother was Zyl Rexha. At the age of 25, Jakup Ferri was married to Pemba, a cousin of Ali Pasha of Gusinje. He had five sons  (Hasan, Mehmed, Omer, Agan, Emin) and three daughters (Kushe, Bardhoke, Zadeja). His descendants in Montenegro had to adopt the surname Ferović. In time, they were able to revert to the original surname.

His son Hasan Ferri (1860–1946) fought together with his father in this battle. In WWII, the Ferri family largely supported Balli Kombëtar and organizations adjacent to it like the Second League of Prizren. Jakup Ferri's grandson Riza (son of Mehmed) was prefect of Dibra in WWII during the annexation of that area in Albania. He committed suicide in Shkodër in 1945 at the eve of his extradition to Yugoslavia, where he was to be tried for war crimes. In wartime, his other grandson, Shemsi (son of Agan) was the prefect of Plav and a delegate of the Second League of Prizren for that area.

The participation of the Ferri family in Balli Kombëtar - a largely anti-communist organization - was cause for Jakup Ferri's exclusion in much of post-war historiography in the People's Republic of Albania about the Albanian National Awakening. In 1979, in the 100th anniversary of the creation the League of Prizren with the personal intervention of Mehmet Shehu, Jakup Ferri was excluded from the list of those who were honored as "Heroes of the Nation" (Hero i Kombit). After 1990, the historical rehabilitation of Jakup Ferri and his son began and they were honored for their service to the nation.

Battle of Novšiće 

He was an active insurgent against the Montenegrin annexation of Plav and Gusinje after 1878. He joined the League of Prizren, established after the Congress of Berlin (1878) that ceded Plav and Gusinje to Montenegro. In 1878, together with many other fighters from Gjakova, they assassinated the Ottoman general Mehmet Ali Pasha who had been sent to pacify the region and force the locals to accept the decisions of the Great Powers.

In the autumn of 1879 notables of Plav and Gusinje established the local Committee of National Salvation. One its first decisions concerned the diversion to the war effort of all taxes that had been collected and the support of the troops with resources. Jakup Ferri was responsible in the region for the organization of the war effort and its resources. Ali Pasha of Gusinje, the leader of the League, appointed him commander for the defence of Plav. He commanded his forces in the retreat from the Montenegrin assaults and managed to cut off the Montenegrins when they counter-attacked. Jakup Ferri fell at the beginning of the Battle of Novšiće, which ended in a victory for the League. On the 4th of January, 1880, Jakup Ferri would be wounded in the battle on the banks of the Lim - which was part of the greater Battle of Nokshiq. He was found standing against the wall of a mountain with 7 wounds and 30 heads surrounding him that he had cut off of the enemy soldiers. Ferri would pass on the 11th of January as a result of his wounds. His actions in 1879 made him a hero of Albanian and Bosniak folk poetry together with Ali Pasha Gucia. In literature, Jakup Ferri is a central character in Gjergj Fishta's The Highland Lute in the chapters (kangë) about the defense of Plav against Montenegro.

References

1832 births
1879 deaths
19th-century Albanian people
People from Plav, Montenegro
Activists of the Albanian National Awakening